Nianzou Tanguy-Austin Kouassi (born 7 June 2002), known as Tanguy Nianzou, is a French professional footballer who plays as a centre-back for La Liga club Sevilla. He has represented France internationally at various youth levels.

Early life
Nianzou Tanguy-Austin Kouassi was born on 7 June 2002 in Paris to Ivorian parents.

Club career

Paris Saint-Germain
An academy graduate of Paris Saint-Germain (PSG), Nianzou made his professional debut on 7 December 2019 in a 3–1 league win against Montpellier. A few days later, he played in his first UEFA Champions League match as PSG were victorious 5–0 over Galatasaray.

Nianzou scored his first goal in a 3–0 Coupe de France win against Reims on 22 January 2020. This goal he scored was the 4,000th goal in PSG's history. He scored his first two Ligue 1 goals in an away game that ended in a 4–4 draw against Amiens on 15 February 2020. On 11 March, Nianzou played his final match for PSG, a 2–0 UEFA Champions League victory over Borussia Dortmund. He left the Parisian club upon the expiration of his contract, and signed for Bayern Munich on a free transfer.

Bayern Munich
On 1 July 2020, Bundesliga club Bayern Munich announced the signing of Nianzou on a four-year deal. He made his debut in a 3–1 league win against VfB Stuttgart on 28 November. On 12 December, Nianzou suffered a muscle injury, and was ruled out for one to two months. The injury was lingering from a previous injury that occurred at the beginning of the 2020–21 season. His return proved to come later than expected, as he appeared as a substitute in a 1–1 draw to Union Berlin on 10 April 2021.

Sevilla
On 17 August 2022, Nianzou signed a five-year contract with Spanish club Sevilla. Two days later, Nianzou made his debut against Real Valladolid. On 11 October, he scored his first Champions League goal in a 1–1 away draw against Borussia Dortmund.

International career
Nianzou is a French youth international. He was part of French squad which reached semi-finals in 2019 UEFA European Under-17 Championship.

He was an important part of French team which finished third at 2019 FIFA U-17 World Cup. He started all seven matches of France in the tournament and scored the equaliser in his team's 6–1 pre-quarter win against Spain.

Career statistics

Honours
Paris Saint-Germain
Ligue 1: 2019–20
Coupe de France: 2019–20
Coupe de la Ligue: 2019–20
UEFA Champions League runner-up: 2019–20

Bayern Munich
Bundesliga: 2020–21, 2021–22
DFL-Supercup: 2021, 2022

France U17
FIFA U-17 World Cup third place: 2019

Individual
Titi d'Or: 2019
Maurice Revello Tournament Best XI: 2022

References

External links

Profile at the Sevilla FC website

2002 births
Living people
Footballers from Paris
French footballers
Association football defenders
US Sénart-Moissy players
RCP Fontainebleau players
Paris Saint-Germain F.C. players
FC Bayern Munich footballers
Sevilla FC players
Ligue 1 players
Bundesliga players
La Liga players
France youth international footballers
France under-21 international footballers
French expatriate footballers
Expatriate footballers in Germany
Expatriate footballers in Spain
French expatriate sportspeople in Germany
French expatriate sportspeople in Spain
French sportspeople of Ivorian descent